Patricia Rodney is a public health professional and the CEO of Partners in Health, Education and Development, a public health consultancy organization the works in the United States and internationally, and the chair of the board of directors of the nonprofit Walter Rodney Foundation, which she helped found in 2006 in memory of her husband. The foundation, which has its headquarters in Atlanta, Georgia, promotes education, health, and human development from a social justice perspective, and aims to improve lives and develop human resources through scholarship.

Personal life 
Before her life in advocacy, Rodney studied as a nurse. She married Guyanese scholar and social activist Walter Rodney in 1965, London, England, and had three children with him, Shaka, Kanini, and Asha, the first in England and the latter two in Tanzania.

Walter Rodney 

Walter Rodney was a public speaker about the role of West Indians and other immigrants to England and their contributions to the United Kingdom. He campaigned for the working class rights and bottom-up community engagement, which he continued in Guyana, where he became a lecturer at the University of Guyana in 1974. The family was harassed constantly by police searches, extending to friends, relatives, and the children, leading Patricia and Walter to stay at safe houses while their children stayed with relatives and friends. On 13 June 1980, a bomb exploded in Walter's car, killing him.

Patricia and her children moved to Barbados less than three weeks later. She wished to stay in the Caribbean near her family roots, and considered Barbados the most politically stable Caribbean country. She chose her job so the hours would suit her children's schooling, and raised the three as a single parent. Due to problems with Walter's death certificate, she was unable to collect his life insurance.

On 20 October 2014, Patricia testified before the Commission Of Inquiry (COI) into the death of Walter Rodney.

Independent career 

Rodney's career has spanned more than 40 years across Africa, the Caribbean, and North America. She worked as an academic and mentor to international public health professionals, and was a professor and assistant dean for public health education at the Morehouse School of Medicine for 15 years.

Patricia Rodney presented the 2019 Walter Rodney Lecture, "Living with a Legacy: My Journey with Walter Rodney", at the Yesu Persaud Centre for Caribbean Studies, University of Warwick.

She has been the CEO of Partners in Health, Education and Development (PHEAD) since 2011. As of 2019, she is an Adjunct Professor in the Department of Community Health & Preventive Medicine at the Morehouse School of Medicine.

Rodney is the author of The Caribbean State, Health Care and Women: An Analysis of Barbados and Grenada During the 1979-1983 Period.

References

External links 
 Official Twitter
 Biography on the Population Council website
 Essay by Julia Bunting on her personal experiences in Tanzania

Living people
Year of birth missing (living people)